Eladio Campos Alemán (born 20 February 1936) is a Mexican former racewalker who competed in the 1968 Summer Olympics.

References

1936 births
Living people
Mexican male racewalkers
Olympic athletes of Mexico
Athletes (track and field) at the 1968 Summer Olympics
Pan American Games competitors for Mexico
Athletes (track and field) at the 1967 Pan American Games
Athletes (track and field) at the 1971 Pan American Games
Central American and Caribbean Games gold medalists for Mexico
Competitors at the 1970 Central American and Caribbean Games
Central American and Caribbean Games medalists in athletics
20th-century Mexican people